Colin Low is the name of:
Colin Low (filmmaker) (1926–2016), Canadian animation and documentary filmmaker
Colin Low, Baron Low of Dalston (born 1942), British politician, law scholar and member of the House of Lords